Rait Castle is a ruined hall-house castle dating from the thirteenth century, situated just south of Nairn near Inverness, Scotland. It is a scheduled monument.

Architecture

The remains of the courtyard walls are nine feet high and also contain the remains of the Chapel of St Mary of Rait. The building was a two story building, measuring 20 metres by 10 metres. It had an unvaulted basement and an upper hall. The hall was entered from the outside and was protected by a portcullis and a drawbar. The walls of the castle are nearly 6 feet thick. A tower projects from one corner of the castle and there is a garderobe tower on the west side that projects nearly 13 feet.

History

The castle was originally a property of the Comyn family, who took the name of de Rait. Sir Alexander Rait killed the third Thane of Cawdor (chief of Clan Calder), and then fled south where he married the heiress of Hallgreen. The castle later passed from the de Raits to the Mackintosh family and then to the Campbell family.

In 1442, when the castle passed to the Mackintoshes from the de Rait family, a feast was held at the castle between the two families which ended in the slaughter of most of the Comyns and de Raits. The laird blamed his daughter, whom he chased around the castle. She climbed out of a window but he chopped off her hands and she fell to her death. The castle is said to be haunted by her ghost, with no hands.

The Duke of Cumberland is said to have stayed at the castle before the Battle of Culloden in 1746, although the last recorded reference to the castle was in 1596.

American singer Bonnie Raitt is a descendant of the Rait clan, and visited Rait Castle in 1990.

References

External links
Stand Up for Rait Castle! saveraitcastle.org
Rait Castle canmore.rcahms.gov.uk. (Canmore)

Rait
Rait
Rait Castle
Rait Castle
Scheduled Ancient Monuments in Highland